VnExpress is a Vietnamese online newspaper, run by FPT Group. It was the first newspaper in Vietnam that was not produced in paper format. It is one of the most popular websites in Vietnam according to Alexa Internet.

In 2020, its website had 10 billion views and received more than 5 million comments, with an average session duration of five minutes and 44 seconds.

VnExpress also operates an English-language edition, known as VnExpress International.

References

External links

VnExpress International – English version of VnExpress

Vietnamese-language newspapers
2001 establishments in Vietnam
Publications established in 2001
Vietnamese news websites